La Capilla is a town and municipality in the Eastern Boyacá Province, part of the Colombian department of Boyacá.

Borders 

 North with Úmbita and Pachavita
 South with Tenza and Cundinamarca
 West with Cundinamarca
 East with Pachavita and Tenza

Etymology 
La Capilla was originally called La Capilla de Tenza, after the Our Lady of Candle appeared in the outskirts of the village. Because of this, a chapel was built; hence the name Capilla.

History 
The first inhabitants of the region of La Capilla were the Muisca, who were organised in their loose Muisca Confederation. The people of the area of La Capilla were loyal to the caciques of Garagoa, Sutatenza and Somondoco in the Tenza Valley. Conquistador Gonzalo Jiménez de Quesada and his troops passed through this valley in 1537, on their way to the domains of the zaque of Hunza. Modern La Capilla was founded on November 13, 1793, by Juan de la Cruz Aguirre.

Economy 
Main economical activity of La Capilla is agriculture, with cucumbers, tomatoes and beans cultivated.

Other characteristics 
 Market Day: Monday
 Distance from Tunja: 
 Median temperature: 
 Demonym: Capillense

Gallery

References 

Municipalities of Boyacá Department
Populated places established in 1793
1793 establishments in the Spanish Empire